Show Me Your Fangs is the tenth studio album by American singer-songwriter Matt Nathanson. It was released on October 2, 2015. Show Me Your Fangs is Nathanson's fourth album for Vanguard Records, following his 2007 album Some Mad Hope, 2011 album Modern Love and 2013 album Last of the Great Pretenders.
The first single, "Headphones", featuring Lolo was released in June 2014. For the video, Nathanson joined  Starkey Hearing Technologies in Peru to help people with hearing loss. Following the release of "Headphones", Nathanson went on a two-month stateside co-headlining tour with his longtime friend Gavin DeGraw. In May 2015, the next single "Gold in the Summertime", was released and Nathanson headed out on a nationwide tour with Train and The Fray. The tour kicked off on May 21 at Sleep Train Amphitheatre at Sacramento in Marysville CA, with shows throughout the U.S. The tour wrapped up on July 25 at Gorge Amphitheatre in Quincy, Wash. "Giants", the third single off the newest album, was released in August, 2015. "Giants" was used as the theme song for the 2016 World Series of Poker on ESPN. The "Show Me Your Fangs Acoustic Tour - an evening with Matt Nathanson" kicked off September 21, 2015 at the Brighton Music Hall in Boston and ended in San Diego at the Casbah on October 30, 2015.

Track listing

Charts

References

External links 
 mattnathanson.com

Matt Nathanson albums
2015 albums
Vanguard Records albums